Korely is a rural locality (a village) in Talazhskoye Rural Settlement of Primorsky District, Arkhangelsk Oblast, Russia. The population was 5 as of 2010.

Geography 
Korely is located on the Povrakulsky Island, 20 km northeast of Arkhangelsk (the district's administrative centre) by road. Povrakulskaya is the nearest rural locality.

References 

Rural localities in Primorsky District, Arkhangelsk Oblast